Chemical warfare (CW) involves using the toxic properties of chemical substances as weapons. This type of warfare is distinct from nuclear warfare, biological warfare and radiological warfare, which together make up CBRN, the military acronym for chemical, biological, radiological, and nuclear (warfare or weapons), all of which are considered "weapons of mass destruction" (WMDs), a term that contrasts with conventional weapons.

The use of chemical weapons is prohibited under customary international humanitarian law.

Definition
Chemical warfare is different from the use of conventional weapons or nuclear weapons because the destructive effects of chemical weapons are not primarily due to any explosive force. The offensive use of living organisms (such as anthrax) is considered biological warfare rather than chemical warfare; however, the use of nonliving toxic products produced by living organisms (e.g. toxins such as botulinum toxin, ricin, and saxitoxin) is considered chemical warfare under the provisions of the Chemical Weapons Convention (CWC). Under this convention, any toxic chemical, regardless of its origin, is considered a chemical weapon unless it is used for purposes that are not prohibited (an important legal definition known as the General Purpose Criterion).

About 70 different chemicals have been used or were stockpiled as chemical warfare agents during the 20th century. The entire class, known as Lethal Unitary Chemical Agents and Munitions, have been scheduled for elimination by the CWC.

Under the convention, chemicals that are toxic enough to be used as chemical weapons, or that may be used to manufacture such chemicals, are divided into three groups according to their purpose and treatment:
 Schedule 1 – Have few, if any, legitimate uses. These may only be produced or used for research, medical, pharmaceutical or protective purposes (i.e. testing of chemical weapons sensors and protective clothing). Examples include nerve agents, ricin, lewisite and mustard gas. Any production over  must be reported to the Organisation for the Prohibition of Chemical Weapons (OPCW) and a country can have a stockpile of no more than one tonne of these chemicals.
 Schedule 2 – Have no large-scale industrial uses, but may have legitimate small-scale uses. Examples include dimethyl methylphosphonate, a precursor to sarin also used as a flame retardant, and thiodiglycol, a precursor chemical used in the manufacture of mustard gas but also widely used as a solvent in inks.
 Schedule 3 – Have legitimate large-scale industrial uses. Examples include phosgene and chloropicrin. Both have been used as chemical weapons but phosgene is an important precursor in the manufacture of plastics, and chloropicrin is used as a fumigant. The OPCW must be notified of, and may inspect, any plant producing more than 30 tons per year.

Chemical weapons are divided into three categories:
 Category 1 - based on Schedule 1 substances
 Category 2 - based on non-Schedule 1 substances
 Category 3 - devices and equipment designed to use chemical weapons, without the substances themselves

History 

Simple chemical weapons were used sporadically throughout antiquity and into the Industrial Age. It was not until the 19th century that the modern conception of chemical warfare emerged, as various scientists and nations proposed the use of asphyxiating or poisonous gasses.

Multiple international treaties were passed banning chemical weapons based upon the alarm of nations and scientists. This however did not prevent the extensive use of chemical weapons in World War I. The development of chlorine gas, among others, was used by both sides to try to break the stalemate of trench warfare. Though largely ineffective over the long run, it decidedly changed the nature of the war. In many cases the gasses used did not kill, but instead horribly maimed, injured, or disfigured casualties. Some 1.3 million gas casualties were recorded, which may have included up to 260,000 civilian casualties.

The interwar years saw the occasional use of chemical weapons, mainly to put down rebellions. In Nazi Germany, much research went into developing new chemical weapons, such as potent nerve agents. However, chemical weapons saw little battlefield use in World War II. Both sides were prepared to use such weapons, but the Allied Powers never did, and the Axis used them only very sparingly. The reason for the lack of use by the Nazis, despite the considerable efforts that had gone into developing new varieties, might have been a lack of technical ability or fears that the Allies would retaliate with their own chemical weapons. Those fears were not unfounded: the Allies made comprehensive plans for defensive and retaliatory use of chemical weapons, and stockpiled large quantities. Japanese forces, as part of the Axis, used them more widely, though only against their Asian enemies, as they also feared that using it on Western powers would result in retaliation. Chemical weapons were frequently used against the Kuomintang and Chinese communist troops, the People's Liberation Army. However, the Nazis did extensively use poison gas against civilians, mostly the genocide of European Jews, in The Holocaust. Vast quantities of Zyklon B gas and carbon monoxide were used in the gas chambers of Nazi extermination camps, resulting in the overwhelming majority of some three million deaths. This remains the deadliest use of poison gas in history.

The post-war era has seen limited, though devastating, use of chemical weapons. During the Vietnam War, between 1962 and 1971, the United States military sprayed nearly 20,000,000 U.S. gallons (76,000 m3) of various chemicals – the "rainbow herbicides" and defoliants – in Vietnam, eastern Laos, and parts of Cambodia as part of Operation Ranch Hand, reaching its peak from 1967 to 1969. Some 100,000 Iranian troops were casualties of Iraqi chemical weapons during the Iran–Iraq War. Iraq used mustard gas and nerve agents against its own civilians in the 1988 Halabja chemical attack. The Cuban intervention in Angola saw limited use of organophosphates. The Syrian government has used sarin, chlorine, and mustard gas in the Syrian civil war  mostly against civilians. Terrorist groups have also used chemical weapons, notably in the Tokyo subway sarin attack and the Matsumoto incident. See also chemical terrorism.

Technology

Although crude chemical warfare has been employed in many parts of the world for thousands of years, "modern" chemical warfare began during World War I – see Chemical weapons in World War I.

Initially, only well-known commercially available chemicals and their variants were used. These included chlorine and phosgene gas. The methods used to disperse these agents during battle were relatively unrefined and inefficient. Even so, casualties could be heavy, due to the mainly static troop positions which were characteristic features of trench warfare.

Germany, the first side to employ chemical warfare on the battlefield, simply opened canisters of chlorine upwind of the opposing side and let the prevailing winds do the dissemination. Soon after, the French modified artillery munitions to contain phosgene – a much more effective method that became the principal means of delivery.

Since the development of modern chemical warfare in World War I, nations have pursued research and development on chemical weapons that falls into four major categories: new and more deadly agents; more efficient methods of delivering agents to the target (dissemination); more reliable means of defense against chemical weapons; and more sensitive and accurate means of detecting chemical agents.

Chemical warfare agents

The chemical used in warfare is called a chemical warfare agent (CWA). About 70 different chemicals have been used or stockpiled as chemical warfare agents during the 20th and 21st centuries. These agents may be in liquid, gas or solid form. Liquid agents that evaporate quickly are said to be volatile or have a high vapor pressure. Many chemical agents are volatile organic compounds so they can be dispersed over a large region quickly.

The earliest target of chemical warfare agent research was not toxicity, but development of agents that can affect a target through the skin and clothing, rendering protective gas masks useless. In July 1917, the Germans employed sulfur mustard. Mustard agents easily penetrate leather and fabric to inflict painful burns on the skin.

Chemical warfare agents are divided into lethal and incapacitating categories. A substance is classified as incapacitating if less than 1/100 of the lethal dose causes incapacitation, e.g., through nausea or visual problems.

Persistency
Chemical warfare agents can be classified according to their persistency, a measure of the length of time that a chemical agent remains effective after dissemination. Chemical agents are classified as persistent or nonpersistent.

Agents classified as nonpersistent lose effectiveness after only a few minutes or hours or even only a few seconds. Purely gaseous agents such as chlorine are nonpersistent, as are highly volatile agents such as sarin. Tactically, nonpersistent agents are very useful against targets that are to be taken over and controlled very quickly.

Apart from the agent used, the delivery mode is very important. To achieve a nonpersistent deployment, the agent is dispersed into very small droplets comparable with the mist produced by an aerosol can. In this form not only the gaseous part of the agent (around 50%) but also the fine aerosol can be inhaled or absorbed through pores in the skin.

Modern doctrine requires very high concentrations almost instantly in order to be effective (one breath should contain a lethal dose of the agent). To achieve this, the primary weapons used would be rocket artillery or bombs and large ballistic missiles with cluster warheads. The contamination in the target area is only low or not existent and after four hours sarin or similar agents are not detectable anymore.

By contrast, persistent agents tend to remain in the environment for as long as several weeks, complicating decontamination. Defense against persistent agents requires shielding for extended periods of time. Nonvolatile liquid agents, such as blister agents and the oily VX nerve agent, do not easily evaporate into a gas, and therefore present primarily a contact hazard.

The droplet size used for persistent delivery goes up to 1 mm increasing the falling speed and therefore about 80% of the deployed agent reaches the ground, resulting in heavy contamination. Deployment of persistent agents is intended to constrain enemy operations by denying access to contaminated areas.

Possible targets include enemy flank positions (averting possible counterattacks), artillery regiments, command posts or supply lines. Because it is not necessary to deliver large quantities of the agent in a short period of time, a wide variety of weapons systems can be used.

A special form of persistent agents are thickened agents. These comprise a common agent mixed with thickeners to provide gelatinous, sticky agents. Primary targets for this kind of use include airfields, due to the increased persistency and difficulty of decontaminating affected areas.

Classes
Chemical weapons are agents that come in four categories: choking, blister, blood and nerve.  The agents are organized into several categories according to the manner in which they affect the human body. The names and number of categories varies slightly from source to source, but in general, types of chemical warfare agents are as follows:

There are other chemicals used militarily that are not scheduled by the CWC, and thus are not controlled under the CWC treaties. These include:
 Defoliants and herbicides that destroy vegetation, but are not immediately toxic or poisonous to human beings. Their use is classified as herbicidal warfare. Some batches of Agent Orange, for instance, used by the British during the Malayan Emergency and the United States during the Vietnam War, contained dioxins as manufacturing impurities. Dioxins, rather than Agent Orange itself, have long-term cancer effects and for causing genetic damage leading to serious birth defects.
 Incendiary or explosive chemicals (such as napalm, extensively used by the United States during the Korean War and the Vietnam War, or dynamite) because their destructive effects are primarily due to fire or explosive force, and not direct chemical action. Their use is classified as conventional warfare.
 Viruses, bacteria, or other organisms. Their use is classified as biological warfare. Toxins produced by living organisms are considered chemical weapons, although the boundary is blurry. Toxins are covered by the Biological Weapons Convention.

Designations

Most chemical weapons are assigned a one- to three-letter "NATO weapon designation" in addition to, or in place of, a common name. Binary munitions, in which precursors for chemical warfare agents are automatically mixed in shell to produce the agent just prior to its use, are indicated by a "-2" following the agent's designation (for example, GB-2 and VX-2).

Some examples are given below:

Delivery
The most important factor in the effectiveness of chemical weapons is the efficiency of its delivery, or dissemination, to a target. The most common techniques include munitions (such as bombs, projectiles, warheads) that allow dissemination at a distance and spray tanks which disseminate from low-flying aircraft. Developments in the techniques of filling and storage of munitions have also been important.

Although there have been many advances in chemical weapon delivery since World War I, it is still difficult to achieve effective dispersion. The dissemination is highly dependent on atmospheric conditions because many chemical agents act in gaseous form. Thus, weather observations and forecasting are essential to optimize weapon delivery and reduce the risk of injuring friendly forces.

Dispersion

Dispersion is placing the chemical agent upon or adjacent to a target immediately before dissemination, so that the material is most efficiently used.  Dispersion is the simplest technique of delivering an agent to its target. The most common techniques are munitions, bombs, projectiles, spray tanks and warheads.

World War I saw the earliest implementation of this technique. The actual first chemical ammunition was the French 26 mm cartouche suffocante rifle grenade, fired from a flare carbine. It contained 35g of the tear-producer ethyl bromoacetate, and was used in autumn 1914 – with little effect on the Germans.

The German military contrarily tried to increase the effect of 10.5 cm shrapnel shells by adding an irritant – dianisidine chlorosulfonate. Its use went unnoticed by the British when it was used against them at Neuve Chapelle in October 1914. Hans Tappen, a chemist in the Heavy Artillery Department of the War Ministry, suggested to his brother, the Chief of the Operations Branch at German General Headquarters, the use of the tear-gases benzyl bromide or xylyl bromide.

Shells were tested successfully at the Wahn artillery range near Cologne on January 9, 1915, and an order was placed for 15 cm howitzer shells, designated 'T-shells' after Tappen. A shortage of shells limited the first use against the Russians at the Battle of Bolimów on January 31, 1915; the liquid failed to vaporize in the cold weather, and again the experiment went unnoticed by the Allies.

The first effective use were when the German forces at the Second Battle of Ypres simply opened cylinders of chlorine and allowed the wind to carry the gas across enemy lines. While simple, this technique had numerous disadvantages. Moving large numbers of heavy gas cylinders to the front-line positions from where the gas would be released was a lengthy and difficult logistical task.

Stockpiles of cylinders had to be stored at the front line, posing a great risk if hit by artillery shells. Gas delivery depended greatly on wind speed and direction. If the wind was fickle, as at the Battle of Loos, the gas could blow back, causing friendly casualties.

Gas clouds gave plenty of warning, allowing the enemy time to protect themselves, though many soldiers found the sight of a creeping gas cloud unnerving. This made the gas doubly effective, as, in addition to damaging the enemy physically, it also had a psychological effect on the intended victims.

Another disadvantage was that gas clouds had limited penetration, capable only of affecting the front-line trenches before dissipating. Although it produced limited results in World War I, this technique shows how simple chemical weapon dissemination can be.

Shortly after this "open canister" dissemination, French forces developed a technique for delivery of phosgene in a non-explosive artillery shell. This technique overcame many of the risks of dealing with gas in cylinders. First, gas shells were independent of the wind and increased the effective range of gas, making any target within reach of guns vulnerable. Second, gas shells could be delivered without warning, especially the clear, nearly odorless phosgenethere are numerous accounts of gas shells, landing with a "plop" rather than exploding, being initially dismissed as dud high explosive or shrapnel shells, giving the gas time to work before the soldiers were alerted and took precautions.

The major drawback of artillery delivery was the difficulty of achieving a killing concentration. Each shell had a small gas payload and an area would have to be subjected to saturation bombardment to produce a cloud to match cylinder delivery. A British solution to the problem was the Livens Projector. This was effectively a large-bore mortar, dug into the ground that used the gas cylinders themselves as projectiles – firing a 14 kg cylinder up to 1500 m. This combined the gas volume of cylinders with the range of artillery.

Over the years, there were some refinements in this technique. In the 1950s and early 1960s, chemical artillery rockets and cluster bombs contained a multitude of submunitions, so that a large number of small clouds of the chemical agent would form directly on the target.

Thermal dissemination

Thermal dissemination is the use of explosives or pyrotechnics to deliver chemical agents. This technique, developed in the 1920s, was a major improvement over earlier dispersal techniques, in that it allowed significant quantities of an agent to be disseminated over a considerable distance. Thermal dissemination remains the principal method of disseminating chemical agents today.

Most thermal dissemination devices consist of a bomb or projectile shell that contains a chemical agent and a central "burster" charge; when the burster detonates, the agent is expelled laterally.

Thermal dissemination devices, though common, are not particularly efficient. First, a percentage of the agent is lost by incineration in the initial blast and by being forced onto the ground. Second, the sizes of the particles vary greatly because explosive dissemination produces a mixture of liquid droplets of variable and difficult to control sizes.

The efficacy of thermal detonation is greatly limited by the flammability of some agents. For flammable aerosols, the cloud is sometimes totally or partially ignited by the disseminating explosion in a phenomenon called flashing. Explosively disseminated VX will ignite roughly one third of the time. Despite a great deal of study, flashing is still not fully understood, and a solution to the problem would be a major technological advance.

Despite the limitations of central bursters, most nations use this method in the early stages of chemical weapon development, in part because standard munitions can be adapted to carry the agents.

Aerodynamic dissemination
Aerodynamic dissemination is the non-explosive delivery of a chemical agent from an aircraft, allowing aerodynamic stress to disseminate the agent. This technique is the most recent major development in chemical agent dissemination, originating in the mid-1960s.

This technique eliminates many of the limitations of thermal dissemination by eliminating the flashing effect and theoretically allowing precise control of particle size. In actuality, the altitude of dissemination, wind direction and velocity, and the direction and velocity of the aircraft greatly influence particle size.

Significant research is still being applied toward this technique. For example, by modifying the properties of the liquid, its breakup when subjected to aerodynamic stress can be controlled and an idealized particle distribution achieved, even at supersonic speed. Additionally, advances in fluid dynamics, computer modeling, and weather forecasting allow an ideal direction, speed, and altitude to be calculated, such that warfare agent of a predetermined particle size can predictably and reliably hit a target.

Protection against chemical warfare

Ideal protection begins with nonproliferation treaties such as the CWC, and detecting, very early, the signatures of someone building a chemical weapons capability. These include a wide range of intelligence disciplines, such as economic analysis of exports of dual-use chemicals and equipment, human intelligence (HUMINT) such as diplomatic, refugee, and agent reports; photography from satellites, aircraft and drones (IMINT); examination of captured equipment (TECHINT); communications intercepts (COMINT); and detection of chemical manufacturing and chemical agents themselves (MASINT).

If all the preventive measures fail and there is a clear and present danger, then there is a need for detection of chemical attacks,
collective protection, and decontamination. Since industrial accidents can cause dangerous chemical releases (e.g., the Bhopal disaster), these activities are things that civilian, as well as military, organizations must be prepared to carry out. In civilian situations in developed countries, these are duties of HAZMAT organizations, which most commonly are part of fire departments.

Detection has been referred to above, as a technical MASINT discipline; specific military procedures, which are usually the model for civilian procedures, depend on the equipment, expertise, and personnel available. When chemical agents are detected, an alarm needs to sound, with specific warnings over emergency broadcasts and the like. There may be a warning to expect an attack.

If, for example, the captain of a US Navy ship believes there is a serious threat of chemical, biological, or radiological attack, the crew may be ordered to set Circle William, which means closing all openings to outside air, running breathing air through filters, and possibly starting a system that continually washes down the exterior surfaces. Civilian authorities dealing with an attack or a toxic chemical accident will invoke the Incident Command System, or local equivalent, to coordinate defensive measures.

Individual protection starts with a gas mask and, depending on the nature of the threat, through various levels of protective clothing up to a complete chemical-resistant suit with a self-contained air supply. The US military defines various levels of MOPP (mission-oriented protective posture) from mask to full chemical resistant suits; Hazmat suits are the civilian equivalent, but go farther to include a fully independent air supply, rather than the filters of a gas mask.

Collective protection allows continued functioning of groups of people in buildings or shelters, the latter which may be fixed, mobile, or improvised. With ordinary buildings, this may be as basic as plastic sheeting and tape, although if the protection needs to be continued for any appreciable length of time, there will need to be an air supply, typically an enhanced gas mask.

Decontamination

Decontamination varies with the particular chemical agent used. Some nonpersistent agents, including most pulmonary agents (chlorine, phosgene, and so on), blood gases, and nonpersistent nerve gases (e.g., GB), will dissipate from open areas, although powerful exhaust fans may be needed to clear out buildings where they have accumulated.

In some cases, it might be necessary to neutralize them chemically, as with ammonia as a neutralizer for hydrogen cyanide or chlorine. Riot control agents such as CS will dissipate in an open area, but things contaminated with CS powder need to be aired out, washed by people wearing protective gear, or safely discarded.

Mass decontamination is a less common requirement for people than equipment, since people may be immediately affected and treatment is the action required. It is a requirement when people have been contaminated with persistent agents. Treatment and decontamination may need to be simultaneous, with the medical personnel protecting themselves so they can function.

There may need to be immediate intervention to prevent death, such as injection of atropine for nerve agents. Decontamination is especially important for people contaminated with persistent agents; many of the fatalities after the explosion of a WWII US ammunition ship carrying sulfur mustard, in the harbor of Bari, Italy, after a German bombing on December 2, 1943, came when rescue workers, not knowing of the contamination, bundled cold, wet seamen in tight-fitting blankets.

For decontaminating equipment and buildings exposed to persistent agents, such as blister agents, VX or other agents made persistent by mixing with a thickener, special equipment and materials might be needed. Some type of neutralizing agent will be needed; e.g. in the form of a spraying device with neutralizing agents such as Chlorine, Fichlor, strong alkaline solutions or enzymes. In other cases, a specific chemical decontaminant will be required.

Sociopolitical climate
There are many instances of the use of chemical weapons in battles documented in Greek and Roman historical texts; the earliest example was the deliberate poisoning of Kirrha's water supply with hellebore in the First Sacred War, Greece, about 590 BC.

One of the earliest reactions to the use of chemical agents was from Rome. Struggling to defend themselves from the Roman legions, Germanic tribes poisoned the wells of their enemies, with Roman jurists having been recorded as declaring "armis bella non venenis geri", meaning "war is fought with weapons, not with poisons." Yet the Romans themselves resorted to poisoning wells of besieged cities in Anatolia in the 2nd century BCE.

Before 1915 the use of poisonous chemicals in battle was typically the result of local initiative, and not the result of an active government chemical weapons program. There are many reports of the isolated use of chemical agents in individual battles or sieges, but there was no true tradition of their use outside of incendiaries and smoke. Despite this tendency, there have been several attempts to initiate large-scale implementation of poison gas in several wars, but with the notable exception of World War I, the responsible authorities generally rejected the proposals for ethical reasons or fears of retaliation.

For example, in 1854 Lyon Playfair (later 1st Baron Playfair, GCB, PC, FRS (1818–1898), a British chemist, proposed using a cacodyl cyanide-filled artillery shell against enemy ships during the Crimean War. The British Ordnance Department rejected the proposal as "as bad a mode of warfare as poisoning the wells of the enemy."

Efforts to eradicate chemical weapons

 August 27, 1874: The Brussels Declaration Concerning the Laws and Customs of War is signed, specifically forbidding the "employment of poison or poisoned weapons", although the treaty was not adopted by any nation whatsoever and it never went into effect.
 September 4, 1900: The First Hague Convention, which includes a declaration banning the "use of projectiles the object of which is the diffusion of asphyxiating or deleterious gases," enters into force.
 January 26, 1910: The Second Hague Convention enters into force, prohibiting the use of "poison or poisoned weapons" in warfare.
 February 6, 1922: After World War I, the Washington Arms Conference Treaty prohibited the use of asphyxiating, poisonous or other gases. It was signed by the United States, Britain, Japan, France, and Italy, but France objected to other provisions in the treaty and it never went into effect.
 February 8, 1928: The Geneva Protocol enters into force, prohibiting the use of "asphyxiating, poisonous or other gases, and of all analogous liquids, materials or devices" and "bacteriological methods of warfare".

Chemical weapon proliferation

Despite numerous efforts to reduce or eliminate them, some nations continue to research and/or stockpile chemical warfare agents. To the right is a summary of the nations that have either declared weapon stockpiles or are suspected of secretly stockpiling or possessing CW research programs. Notable examples include United States and Russia.

In 1997, future US Vice President Dick Cheney opposed the signing ratification of a treaty banning the use of chemical weapons, a recently unearthed letter shows. In a letter dated April 8, 1997, then Halliburton-CEO Cheney told Sen. Jesse Helms, the chairman of the Senate Foreign Relations Committee, that it would be a mistake for America to join the convention.  "Those nations most likely to comply with the Chemical Weapons Convention are not likely to ever constitute a military threat to the United States.  The governments we should be concerned about are likely to cheat on the CWC, even if they do participate," reads the letter, published by the Federation of American Scientists.

The CWC was ratified by the Senate that same month. Since then, Albania, Libya, Russia, the United States, and India have declared over 71,000 metric tons of chemical weapon stockpiles, and destroyed about a third of them. Under the terms of the agreement, the United States and Russia agreed to eliminate the rest of their supplies of chemical weapons by 2012. Not having met its goal, the U.S. government estimates remaining stocks will be destroyed by 2017.

Chemical weapons destruction

India
In June 1997, India declared that it had a stockpile of 1044 tons of sulphur mustard in its possession. India's declaration of its stockpile came after its entry into the Chemical Weapons Convention, that created the Organisation for the Prohibition of Chemical Weapons, and on January 14, 1993, India became one of the original signatories to the Chemical Weapons Convention. By 2005, from among six nations that had declared their possession of chemical weapons, India was the only country to meet its deadline for chemical weapons destruction and for inspection of its facilities by the Organisation for the Prohibition of Chemical Weapons. By 2006, India had destroyed more than 75 percent of its chemical weapons and material stockpile and was granted an extension to complete a 100 percent destruction of its stocks by April 2009. On May 14, 2009, India informed the United Nations that it has completely destroyed its stockpile of chemical weapons.

Iraq

The Director-General of the Organisation for the Prohibition of Chemical Weapons, Ambassador Rogelio Pfirter, welcomed Iraq's decision to join the OPCW as a significant step to strengthening global and regional efforts to prevent the spread and use of chemical weapons. The OPCW announced "The government of Iraq has deposited its instrument of accession to the Chemical Weapons Convention with the Secretary General of the United Nations and within 30 days, on 12 February 2009, will become the 186th State Party to the Convention". Iraq has also declared stockpiles of chemical weapons, and because of their recent accession is the only State Party exempted from the destruction time-line.

Japan
During the Second Sino-Japanese War (1937–1945) Japan stored chemical weapons on the territory of mainland China. The weapon stock mostly containing sulfur mustard-lewisite mixture. The weapons are classified as abandoned chemical weapons under the Chemical Weapons Convention, and from September 2010 Japan has started their destruction in Nanjing using mobile destruction facilities in order to do so.

Russia
Russia signed into the Chemical Weapons Convention on January 13, 1993, and ratified it on November 5, 1995. Declaring an arsenal of 39,967 tons of chemical weapons in 1997, by far the largest arsenal, consisting of blister agents: Lewisite, Sulfur mustard, Lewisite-mustard mix, and nerve agents: Sarin, Soman, and VX. Russia met its treaty obligations by destroying 1 percent of its chemical agents by the 2002 deadline set out by the Chemical Weapons Convention, but requested an extension on the deadlines of 2004 and 2007 due to technical, financial, and environmental challenges of chemical disposal. Since, Russia has received help from other countries such as Canada which donated C$100,000, plus a further C$100,000 already donated, to the Russian Chemical Weapons Destruction Program. This money will be used to complete work at Shchuch'ye and support the construction of a chemical weapons destruction facility at Kizner (Russia), where the destruction of nearly 5,700 tons of nerve agent, stored in approximately 2 million artillery shells and munitions, will be undertaken. Canadian funds are also being used for the operation of a Green Cross Public Outreach Office, to keep the civilian population informed on the progress made in chemical weapons destruction activities.

As of July 2011, Russia has destroyed 48 percent (18,241 tons) of its stockpile at destruction facilities located in Gorny (Saratov Oblast) and Kambarka (Udmurt Republic) – where operations have finished – and Schuch'ye (Kurgan Oblast), Maradykovsky (Kirov Oblast), Leonidovka (Penza Oblast) whilst installations are under construction in Pochep (Bryansk Oblast) and Kizner (Udmurt Republic). As August 2013, 76 percent  (30,500 tons) were destroyed, and Russia leaves the Cooperative Threat Reduction (CTR) Program, which partially funded chemical weapons destruction.

In September 2017, OPCW announced that Russia had destroyed its entire chemical weapons stockpile.

United States

On November 25, 1969, President Richard Nixon unilaterally renounced the offensive use of biological and toxic weapons, but the U.S. continued to maintain an offensive chemical weapons program.

From May 1964 to the early 1970s the U.S. participated in Operation CHASE, a United States Department of Defense program that aimed to dispose of chemical weapons by sinking ships laden with the weapons in the deep Atlantic. After the Marine Protection, Research, and Sanctuaries Act of 1972, Operation Chase was scrapped and safer disposal methods for chemical weapons were researched, with the U.S. destroying several thousand tons of sulfur mustard by incineration at the Rocky Mountain Arsenal, and nearly 4,200 tons of nerve agent by chemical neutralisation at Tooele Army Depot.

The U.S. began stockpile reductions in the 1980s with the removal of outdated munitions and destroying its entire stock of 3-Quinuclidinyl benzilate (BZ or Agent 15) at the beginning of 1988. In June 1990 the Johnston Atoll Chemical Agent Disposal System began destruction of chemical agents stored on the Johnston Atoll in the Pacific, seven years before the Chemical Weapons Treaty came into effect. In 1986 President Ronald Reagan made an agreement with the Chancellor, Helmut Kohl to remove the U.S. stockpile of chemical weapons from Germany. In 1990, as part of Operation Steel Box, two ships were loaded with over 100,000 shells containing Sarin and VX were taken from the U.S. Army weapons storage depots such as Miesau and then-classified FSTS (Forward Storage / Transportation Sites) and transported from Bremerhaven, Germany to Johnston Atoll in the Pacific, a 46-day nonstop journey.

In the 1980s, Congress, at the urging of the Reagan administration, Congress provided funding for the manufacture of binary chemical weapons (sarin artillery shells) from 1987 until 1990, but this was halted after the U.S. and the Soviet Union entered into a bilateral agreement in June 1990. In the 1990 agreement, the U.S. and Soviet Union agreed to begin destroying their chemical weapons stockpiles before 1993 and to reduce them to no more than 5,000 agent tons each by the end of 2002. The agreement also provided for exchanges of data and inspections of sites to verify destruction. Following the collapse of the Soviet Union, the U.S.'s Nunn–Lugar Cooperative Threat Reduction program helped eliminate some of the chemical, biological and nuclear stockpiles of the former Soviet Union.

The United Nations Conference on Disarmament in Geneva in 1980 led to the development of the Chemical Weapons Convention (CWC), a multilateral treaty that prohibited the development, production, stockpiling, and use of chemical weapons, and required the elimination of existing stockpiles. The treaty expressly prohibited state parties from making reservations (unilateral caveats). During the Reagan administration and the George H. W. Bush administration, the U.S. participated in the negotiations toward the CWC.  The CWC was concluded on September 3, 1992, and opened for signature on January 13, 1993. The U.S. became one of 87 original state parties to the CWC.  President Bill Clinton submitted it to the U.S. Senate for ratification on November 23, 1993. Ratification was blocked in the Senate for years, largely as a result of opposition from Senator Jesse Helms, the chairman of the Senate Foreign Relations Committee. On April 24, 1997, the Senate gave its consent to ratification of the CWC by a 74–26 vote (satisfying the required two-thirds majority). The U.S. deposited its instrument of ratification at the United Nations on April 25, 1997, a few days before the CWC entered into force. The U.S. ratification allowed the U.S. to participate in the Organisation for the Prohibition of Chemical Weapons, the organization based in The Hague that oversees implementation of the CWC.

Upon U.S. ratification of the CWC, the U.S. declared a total of 29,918 tons of chemical weapons, and committed to destroying all of the U.S.'s chemical weapons and bulk agent. The U.S. was one of eight states to declare a stockpile of chemical weapons and to commit to their safe elimination. The U.S. committed in the CWC to destroy its entire chemical arsenal within 10 years of the entry into force (i.e., by April 29, 2007),  However, at a 2012 conference, the parties to the CWC parties agreed to extend the U.S. deadline to 2023. By 2012, stockpiles had been eliminated at seven of the U.S.'s nine chemical weapons depots and 89.75% of the 1997 stockpile was destroyed. The depots were the Aberdeen Chemical Agent Disposal Facility, Anniston Chemical Disposal Facility, Johnston Atoll, Newport Chemical Agent Disposal Facility, Pine Bluff Chemical Disposal Facility, Tooele Chemical Disposal Facility, Umatilla Chemical Disposal Facility, and Deseret Chemical Depot. The U.S. closed each site after the completion of stockpile destruction. In 2019, the U.S. began to eliminate its chemical-weapon stockpile at the last of the nine U.S. chemical weapons storage facilities: the Blue Grass Army Depot in Kentucky. By May 2021, the U.S. destroyed all of its Category 2 and Category 3 chemical weapons and 96.52% of its Category 1 chemical weapons. The U.S. is scheduled to complete the elimination of all its chemical weapons by the September 2023 deadline.

The U.S. has maintained a "calculated ambiguity" policy that warns potential adversaries that a chemical or biological attack against the U.S. or its allies will prompt a "overwhelming and devastating" response. The policy deliberately leaves open the question of whether the U.S. would respond to a chemical attempt with nuclear retaliation. Commentators have noted that this policy gives policymakers more flexibility, at the possible cost of decreased strategic unpreparedness.

Anti-agriculture

Herbicidal warfare

Although herbicidal warfare use chemical substances, its main purpose is to disrupt agricultural food production and/or to destroy plants which provide cover or concealment to the enemy.

The use of herbicides by the U.S. military during the Vietnam War has left tangible, long-term impacts upon the Vietnamese people and U.S. veterans of the war. The government of Vietnam says that around 24% of the forests of Southern Vietnam were defoliated and up to four million people in Vietnam were exposed to Agent Orange. They state that as many as three million people have developed illness because of Agent Orange while the Red Cross of Vietnam estimates that up to one million people were disabled or have health problems associated with Agent Orange. The United States government has described these figures as unreliable.
During the war, the U.S. fought the North Vietnamese and their allies in Laos and Cambodia, dropping large quantities of Agent Orange in each of those countries. Because Laos and Cambodia were officially neutral during the Vietnam War, the U.S. attempted to keep secret its military involvement in these countries. The U.S. has stated that Agent Orange was not widely used and therefore hasn't offered assistance to affected Cambodians or Laotians, and limits benefits American veterans and CIA personnel who were stationed there.

Anti-livestock

During the Mau Mau Uprising in 1952, the poisonous latex of the African milk bush was used to kill cattle.

See also

 1990 Chemical Weapons Accord
 Ali Hassan al-Majid
 Area denial weapon
 Chemical weapon designation
 Chemical weapons and the United Kingdom
 Gas chamber
 List of CBRN warfare forces
 List of chemical warfare agents
 List of highly toxic gases
 Ronald Maddison
 Psychochemical weapon
 Saint Julien Memorial
 Sardasht, West Azerbaijan, a town attacked with chemical weapons during the Iran–Iraq War
 Stink bomb
 United States Army Medical Research Institute of Chemical Defense

Notes

References

 CBWInfo.com (2001). A Brief History of Chemical and Biological Weapons: Ancient Times to the 19th Century. Retrieved November 24, 2004.
 Chomsky, Noam (March 4, 2001). Prospects for Peace in the Middle East, page 2. Lecture.
 Cordette, Jessica, MPH(c) (2003). Chemical Weapons of Mass Destruction. Retrieved November 29, 2004.
 
 Smart, Jeffery K., M.A. (1997). History of Biological and Chemical Warfare. Retrieved November 24, 2004.
 United States Senate, 103d Congress, 2d Session. (May 25, 1994). The Riegle Report. Retrieved November 6, 2004.
 Gerard J Fitzgerald. American Journal of Public Health. Washington: Apr 2008. Vol. 98, Iss. 4; p. 611

Further reading
 Leo P. Brophy and George J. B. Fisher; The Chemical Warfare Service: Organizing for War Office of the Chief of Military History, 1959; L. P. Brophy, W. D. Miles and C. C. Cochrane, The Chemical Warfare Service: From Laboratory to Field (1959); and B. E. Kleber and D. Birdsell, The Chemical Warfare Service in Combat (1966). official US history;
 Glenn Cross, Dirty War: Rhodesia and Chemical Biological Warfare, 1975–1980, Helion & Company, 2017
 Gordon M. Burck and Charles C. Flowerree; International Handbook on Chemical Weapons Proliferation 1991
 L. F. Haber. The Poisonous Cloud: Chemical Warfare in the First World War Oxford University Press: 1986
 James W. Hammond Jr; Poison Gas: The Myths Versus Reality Greenwood Press, 1999
 Jiri Janata, Role of Analytical Chemistry in Defense Strategies Against Chemical and Biological Attack, Annual Review of Analytical Chemistry, 2009
 Ishmael Jones, The Human Factor: Inside the CIA's Dysfunctional Intelligence Culture, Encounter Books, New York 2008, revised 2010, . WMD espionage.
 Benoit Morel and Kyle Olson; Shadows and Substance: The Chemical Weapons Convention Westview Press, 1993
 Adrienne Mayor, "Greek Fire, Poison Arrows & Scorpion Bombs: Biological and Chemical Warfare in the Ancient World" Overlook-Duckworth, 2003, rev ed with new Introduction 2008
 Geoff Plunkett, Chemical Warfare in Australia: Australia's Involvement In Chemical Warfare 1914 – Today, (2nd Edition), 2013.. Leech Cup Books. A volume in the Army Military History Series published in association with the Army History Unit.
 Jonathan B. Tucker. Chemical Warfare from World War I to Al-Qaeda (2006)

External links

 Official website of the Organisation for the Prohibition of Chemical Weapons (OPCW)
 Rule 74. The use of chemical weapons is prohibited. – section on chemical weapons from Customary IHL Database, an "updated version of the Study on customary international humanitarian law conducted by the International Committee of the Red Cross (ICRC) and originally published by Cambridge University Press."
 Chemical Warfare information page , from the Disaster Information Management Research Center of the U.S. Department of Health and Human Services  including links to relevant sources in the U.S. National Library of Medicine

 
Warfare by type